Zach Crowell is a songwriter and record producer, who was born and raised in Nashville, Tennessee. Crowell is involved in a joint publishing agreement with Round Hill Music and Taperoom Music.

In 2012, he co-wrote and produced the song "Confe$$ions" on the Grammy Award-winning sixth studio album, Gravity by rapper Lecrae.

In 2013, Crowell co-wrote and produced the song "Strong" for singer Will Hoge, which was featured as the theme song for a 2014 Chevrolet Silverado advertising campaign. Crowell has also written and/or produced multiple number one songs including "Take Your Time", "House Party", and "Leave the Night On" for Sam Hunt, and "Where It's At (Yep, Yep)" and "Hell of a Night" for Dustin Lynch. Additionally, Crowell co-wrote and produced the song "Cop Car" by Keith Urban along with having songs recorded by Luke Bryan, Dierks Bentley, Florida Georgia Line and Cole Swindell.

In 2015, Crowell co-wrote and/or produced multiple number one songs for county music star Carrie Underwood's fifth studio album, Storyteller, including the songs "Heartbeat", "Church Bells", and "Dirty Laundry".

Crowell produced and co-wrote the 2017 song "Body Like a Back Road" for singer Sam Hunt. The song set the all-time record at 34 weeks for the most time spent at number one on the Billboard Hot Country Songs chart.

Crowell is a three-time Grammy Award nominee.

Selected Discography

References

Living people
Year of birth missing (living people)
Songwriters from Tennessee
Musicians from Nashville, Tennessee
American country record producers